The Kingman springsnail (Pyrgulopsis conica) is a species of freshwater snail in the family Hydrobiidae, the mud snails. It is endemic to Mohave County, Arizona, in the United States.

It lives in aquatic habitat in the Black Mountains near Kingman, Arizona. It is known from only three springs, where it may be threatened by loss of groundwater. A single drought event could threaten the entire population of the species.

Description
It is convex in shape to rounded with shoulders. Its differentiated from other Pyrgulopsis in that its penial filament has a medium length lobe and medium length filament with the penial ornament consisting of a near-circular terminal gland.

References

Pyrgulopsis
Endemic fauna of Arizona
Gastropods described in 1988
Taxonomy articles created by Polbot